Benjamin Berell Ferencz (born March 11, 1920) is an American lawyer. He was an investigator of Nazi war crimes after World War II and the chief prosecutor for the United States Army at the Einsatzgruppen Trial, one of the 12 Subsequent Nuremberg Trials held by the U.S. authorities at Nuremberg, Germany. Later, he became an advocate of international rule of law and for the establishment of an International Criminal Court. From 1985 to 1996, he was adjunct professor of international law at Pace University.

Biography

Early life and education
Ferencz was born on March 11, 1920, in Csolt, Szatmár County, Kingdom of Hungary, located close to the historical Transylvania region (today part of Șomcuta Mare, Romania) into a Jewish family. A few months later, Transylvania was ceded to Romania under the Treaty of Trianon (1920), the result of World War I. When Ferencz was ten months old, his family emigrated to the United States, which, according to his own account, was to avoid the persecution of Hungarian Jews by Romania after Romania gained formal control of Transylvania and Eastern Hungary.

The family settled in New York City, where they lived on the Lower East Side in Manhattan.<ref name="ushmm">USHMM: "Chief prosecutor Benjamin Ferencz presents his case at the Einsatzgruppen Trial", encyclopedia.ushmm.org; accessed November 23, 2021.</ref>

Ferencz studied crime prevention at the City College of New York, and his criminal law exam result won him a scholarship to Harvard Law School. At Harvard, he studied under Roscoe Pound and also did research for Sheldon Glueck who, at that time, was writing a book on war crimes. Ferencz graduated from Harvard in 1943. After his studies, he joined the U.S. Army. His time as a soldier in the army began bleakly with a job as a typist in Camp Davis in North Carolina. At that time, he was not familiar with using a typewriter, and he couldn't fire a weapon. His job duties also consisted of unceremoniously cleaning toilets and scrubbing pots and floors. In 1944, he 
served in the 115th AAA Gun Battalion, an anti-aircraft artillery unit.

In 1945, he was transferred to the headquarters of General Patton's Third Army, where he was assigned to a team tasked with setting up a war crimes branch and collecting evidence for such crimes. In that role, he was sent to the concentration camps that had been liberated by the U.S. army.

Nuremberg trial prosecutor

On Christmas 1945, Ferencz was honorably discharged from the Army with the rank of sergeant. He returned to New York, but was recruited only a few weeks later to participate as a prosecutor (and now made a full Colonel as part of his agreement to go) in the Subsequent Nuremberg Trials in the legal team of Telford Taylor. Taylor appointed him chief prosecutor in the Einsatzgruppen Case —Ferencz's first case. All of the 22 men on trial were convicted; 13 of them received death sentences, of which four were eventually carried out. Apart from East Germany, they were the last executions performed on German soil, and in the federal republic.

In a 2005 interview for The Washington Post, he revealed some of his activities during his period in Germany by way of showing how different military legal norms were at the time:

Ferencz stayed in Germany after the Nuremberg Trials, together with his wife Gertrude, whom he had married in New York on March 31, 1946. Together with Kurt May and others, he participated in the setup of reparation and rehabilitation programs for the victims of persecutions by the Nazis, and also had a part in the negotiations that led to the Reparations Agreement between Israel and West Germany signed on September 10, 1952 and the first German Restitution Law in 1953. In 1956, the family—they had four children by then—returned to the U.S., where Ferencz entered private law practice as a partner of Telford Taylor. While pursuing claims of Jewish forced laborers against the Flick concern (the subject of the Flick trial), Ferencz observed the "interesting phenomenon of history and psychology that very frequently the criminal comes to see himself as the victim".

Role in forming the International Criminal Court
Experiences just after World War II left a defining impression on Ferencz. After 13 years, and under the influence of the events of the Vietnam War, Ferencz left the private law practice and henceforth worked for the institution of an International Criminal Court that would serve as a worldwide highest instance for issues of crimes against humanity and war crimes.

He also published several books on this subject. Already in his first book published in 1975, entitled Defining International Aggression-The Search for World Peace, he argued for the establishment of such an international court. From 1985 to 1996, Ferencz also worked as an adjunct professor of international law at Pace University at White Plains, New York.

An International Criminal Court was indeed established on July 1, 2002, when the Rome Statute of the International Criminal Court came into force. Under the Bush administration, the U.S. signed the treaty, but didn't ratify it. The administration of George W. Bush concluded a large number of bilateral agreements with other states that would exclude U.S. citizens from being brought before the ICC.

Ferencz has repeatedly argued against this procedure and suggested that the U.S. join the ICC without reservations, as it was a long-established rule of law that "law must apply equally to everyone", also in an international context. In this vein, he has suggested in an interview given on August 25, 2006, that not only Saddam Hussein should be tried, but also George W. Bush because the Iraq War had been begun by the U.S. without permission by the UN Security Council. He also suggested that Bush should be tried in the International Criminal Court for '269 war crime charges' related to the Iraq War.

In 2013, Ferencz stated once more that the "use of armed force to obtain a political goal should be condemned as an international and a national crime."

Ferencz wrote in 2018, in a preface to a book on the future of international justice, that "war-making itself is the supreme international crime against humanity and that it should be deterred by punishment universally, wherever and whenever offenders are apprehended".

Later years
In 2009, Ferencz was awarded the Erasmus Prize, together with Antonio Cassese; the award is given to individuals or institutions that have made notable contributions to European culture, society, or social science.

On May 3, 2011, two days after the death of Osama bin Laden was reported, The New York Times published a Ferencz letter which argued that "illegal and unwarranted execution – even of suspected mass murderers – undermines democracy".Letter to NY Times re: Bin Laden's Killing  May 3, 2011 Also that year he presented a closing statement in the trial of Thomas Lubanga Dyilo in Uganda.

On March 16, 2012, in another letter to the editor of The New York Times, Ferencz hailed the International Criminal Court's conviction of Thomas Lubanga as "a milestone in the evolution of international criminal law".

In April 2017, the municipality of The Hague announced the naming of the footpath next to the Peace Palace the Benjamin Ferenczpad ("Benjamin Ferencz Path"), calling him "one of the figureheads of international justice". The city's Deputy Mayor Saskia Bruines (International Affairs) traveled to Washington to symbolically present the street sign to Ferencz.

In 2018, Ferencz was the subject of a documentary on his life, Prosecuting Evil, by director Barry Avrich, which was made available on Netflix. In the same year, Ferencz was interviewed for the 2018 Michael Moore documentary, Fahrenheit 11/9.

On June 20, 2019, artist and sculptor Yaacov Heller honored Ferencz—presenting him with a bust he created—commemorating his extraordinary life dedicated to genocide prevention.

On January 16, 2020, The New York Times printed Ferencz's letter denouncing the assassination of the Iranian general Qassem Soleimani, unnamed in the letter, as an "immoral action [and] a clear violation of national and international law". He became a centenarian two months later. Six months later on September 7, the documentary Two Heads Are Better Than One: Making of the Ben Ferencz Bust, starring Ferencz and sculptor Yaacov Heller, had a world premiere, produced by Eric Kline Productions and directed by Eric Kline.

On June 22, 2021, he became the first recipient of the Pahl Peace Prize in Liechtenstein.

In March 2022, an audio clip of Ben Ferencz was played during the Eleventh emergency special session of the United Nations General Assembly and he later gave an interview to BBC Radio 4's The World Tonight on the Russian invasion of Ukraine. He also says that Vladimir Putin should be 'behind bars' for his war crimes, and says he is "heartbroken" over atrocities in Ukraine.

On  April 7, 2022, Florida Governor Ron DeSantis awarded Ferencz the Governor’s Medal of Freedom at a ceremony held at Florida Atlantic University.

In September 2022, Ferencz appeared in the Ken Burns documentary, "The U.S. and the Holocaust."In December 2022, Ferencz was awarded the Congressional Gold Medal. https://www.jns.org/bipartisan-bill-awards-congressional-gold-medal-to-last-living-nuremberg-prosecutor/

In January 2023, Ferencz appeared in the David Wilkinson documentary, "Getting Away with Murder(s)".Personal life
Ferencz married his teenage sweetheart Gertrude Fried, in New York in 1946.  They were  married for more than 70 years, “without a quarrel”, until her death in 2019. They had four children.

He is the last surviving prosecutor at the Nuremberg Trials.

Selected bibliography
 Parting Words (Hardcover), Benjamin Ferencz, Published by Little, Brown Book Group, London, 2020; 
 Ferencz, B.: "The 'Immoral' Killing of the Iranian General", New York Times Letter to Editor, January 16, 2020.
 Ferencz, B.: "Kriegsverbrechen, Restitution, Prävention. Aus dem Vorlass von Benjamin B. Ferencz", ed. by Constantin Goschler, Marcus Böick, Julia Reus, Göttingen 2019 (collection of documents, open access).
 Ferencz, B.: Mémoires de Ben, procureur à Nuremberg et avocat de la paix mondiale, (an autobiography), Michalon, Paris, 2012.
 Ferencz, B.: New Legal Foundations for Global Survival: Security Through the Security Council, Oceana 1994; .
 Ferencz, B.: Keyes, K. Jr.: Planethood: The Key to Your Future, Vision Books 1988. Reprint 1991; .
 Ferencz, B.: A Common Sense Guide to World Peace, Oceana 1985.
 Ferencz, B.: Enforcing International Law: A Way to World Peace, Oceana 1983.
 Ferencz, B.: Less Than Slaves: Jewish Forced Labor and the Quest for Compensation, Harvard 1979. Reprint 2002, Indiana University Press & USHMM; .
 Ferencz, B.: An International Criminal Court: A Step Toward World Peace, Oceana 1980. .
 Ferencz, B.: Defining International Aggression: The Search for World Peace, Oceana 1975. .

Lectures
 The Evolution of International Criminal Law - A Personal Account in the Lecture Series of the United Nations Audiovisual Library of International Law

 Awards 
 1980: National Jewish Book Award in the Holocaust category for Less Than Slaves: Jewish Forced Labor and the Quest for Compensation''
 2021: honorary Doctorate awarded by the faculty of law of the University of Cologne
2021: Awardee of the Pahl Peace Prize in Liechtenstein
2022: Governor's Medal of Freedom of the State of Florida

See also

War crimes committed by the United States
The International Criminal Court and the 2003 invasion of Iraq
Review Conference of the International Criminal Court Statute
United States and the International Criminal Court
List of peace activists

References

External links

 
 A lecture Ferencz gave on Memorial Day, 2006, at the Library of Congress
 Benjamin Ferencz on Humankind
 Benjamin Ferencz on Nuremberg War Crimes Trials on C-SPAN
 Oral history interview with Benjamin Ferencz at the United States Holocaust Memorial Museum
 Biographical Interview with Benjamin Ferencz published at "Quellen zur Geschichte der Menschenrechte"
 

1920 births
Living people
20th-century American Jews
20th-century American lawyers
20th-century American male writers
20th-century American non-fiction writers
21st-century American Jews
21st-century American lawyers
21st-century American male writers
21st-century American non-fiction writers
American autobiographers
American anti-fascists
American centenarians
American male non-fiction writers
American pacifists
American people of Hungarian-Jewish descent
City College of New York alumni
Commanders Crosses of the Order of Merit of the Federal Republic of Germany
Harvard Law School alumni
Hungarian Jews
Jewish American military personnel
Jewish American writers
Lawyers from New York City
Men centenarians
Military personnel from New York City
Pace University faculty
Romanian Jews
Romanian emigrants to the United States
United States Army Judge Advocate General's Corps
United States Army non-commissioned officers
United States Army personnel of World War II
Writers from Manhattan